Epopaea is a genus of beetle in the family Cerambycidae. Its only species is Epopaea acuta. It was described by Thomson in 1864.

References

Pteropliini
Beetles described in 1864